A senior house officer (SHO) is a non-consultant hospital doctor in the Republic of Ireland. SHOs are supervised in their work by consultants and registrars. In training posts these registrars and consultants oversee training and are usually their designated clinical supervisors.

The same structure to junior doctor grades also applied previously in the National Health Service in the UK, and informal use of the term persists there.

Irish usage

NCHD grades in order, from most junior to most senior:
 Intern — (post-graduate year 1)
 Senior house officer — (PGY ≥ 2)
 Registrar — (PGY ≥ 3)
 Specialist registrar — (PGY ≥ 4)
 Fellow (PGY variable)

In Ireland, physicians typically spend one year as an intern, before becoming a Senior House Officer (SHO). Most doctors spend between 2–4 years working as an SHO. Advancing to registrar level is dependent on experience and aptitude within a specialty; in most cases, becoming a registrar depends primarily on having successfully passed postgraduate examinations such as MRCP/MRCS, although this is not a strict requirement. Most doctors work at registrar level for 1–3 years before being accepted onto a training programme in a particular subspecialty (e.g. Cardiology), after which time, they are known as SpRs (Specialist Registrars). SpR programmes typically last for between 3–6 years. On completion of an SpR programme, doctors are eligible to apply for consultant positions, although the majority opt to undertake 1–2 years of fellowship training – often abroad – prior to appointment at consultant level.

Former UK usage

Since the introduction of Modernising Medical Careers (MMC), grades in the UK differ from those in the Republic of Ireland.

British postgraduate training
Before MMC, physicians applied for SHO posts after completing their mandatory pre-registration house officer (PRHO) year after qualifying from medical school. They would typically work as an SHO for 2–3 years, or occasionally longer, before going on to a certain subspeciality where they would take up a specialist registrar post to  train as a specialist in that particular field. To qualify for these, SHOs had to be in posts approved by a regional postgraduate dean, as well as passing postgraduate exams (such as the Membership of the Royal College of Physicians, MRCP). SHO jobs typically lasted four or six months in various departments and were often provided in one- or two-year rotations.

Modernising medical careers

In 2002, the Department of Health announced reforms in the training of newly qualified doctors under the banner of "Modernising Medical Careers", merging the PRHO year and the first year of SHO training into a "foundation programme" (FY1 and FY2). This programme was formally introduced in August 2005.

In August 2002, Professor Sir Liam Donaldson, the then Chief Medical Officer, published a report titled "Unfinished Business", which focused on reforming SHO training. The SHO grade was abolished and renamed specialty registrar. This change took place in 2007. Amongst the many changes, many doctors who had completed their Foundation Training were now appointed into a "run-through" training programme that incorporated the previous SHO and specialist registrar grades. The job title changed from "SHO" to "ST1/ST2" (specialist trainee year 1 & year 2). Part of this decision was subsequently reversed in a number of specialties, with competitive entry into the registrar grade ("uncoupled training"), and in these specialties the SHO level posts are referred to as "CT1/CT2" (core trainee year 1 & year 2) and in some "CT3".

Current status in the UK
Some hospitals use the term senior house officer in an unofficial capacity for physicians in FY2 and CT1/2 year, who often have similar working patterns in duty shift rotas.

The term still applies to non training posts, those organised by a hospital/trust as opposed to a Deanery, where a physician is employed at a level after full registration with the GMC and before entering higher specialty training. These posts are typically referred to as "Trust SHO", "Junior Clinical Fellow" or other such terms.

United States
In the United States, physicians in training are also sometimes referred to as "senior house officers" in their later years of residency, but the term is more variable in its American than its European usage.

Use in the rest of the world 
Specializing post-graduate clinical students are still referred to as Senior House Officers in many other countries around the world, most of which were British colonies and adopted the British education system like Uganda.

See also
 Junior doctor
 Non-consultant hospital doctor
 Internship (medicine)
 Consultant (medicine)

References

External links
 UK medical training
 MMC home page

Medical education in the United Kingdom
Healthcare occupations in the United Kingdom